NuFX was a video game developer, headquartered in Hoffman Estates, Illinois, United States. NuFX is famous for developing the NBA Street video game series. They were acquired by Electronic Arts in February 2004 and was merged into EA Chicago. Before their acquisition by Electronic Arts they had already worked with them on the NCAA March Madness, NBA LIVE and FIFA Soccer series.

Games developed

Notes

References

External links

Electronic Arts
Defunct companies based in Illinois
Defunct video game companies of the United States
Hoffman Estates, Illinois
Video game companies established in 1990
Video game companies disestablished in 2004
Video game development companies